Build Bright United FC was a football (soccer) club in Phnom Penh, Cambodia. It played in the Cambodian-League, the top division of Cambodian football. It was dissolved in 2016  due to financial problems.

See also
 Build Bright University

References

Football clubs in Cambodia
Sport in Phnom Penh